The Windsor Sculpture Park, formerly known as the Odette Sculpture Park, is an open space in Windsor, Ontario, Canada, that shows 35 large-scale contemporary sculptures by world-renowned artists including Elisabeth Frink, Gerald Gladstone, and Sorel Etrog.

The park is located on the shore of the Detroit River, spanning from Assumption Park to Centennial Park, between the Ambassador Bridge (Huron Church Road) and the Art Gallery of Windsor (Church Street).

The Sculpture Park was funded by Mr and Mrs Louis Odette and the P & L Odette Foundation. The park is maintained by the city's Parks and Recreation Department, while the sculptures are cared for by the Cultural Affairs Department.

The City of Windsor provides free public guided tours of the five kilometre open air gallery. The tours are done in a vehicle called The Art Cart; an electric golf cart which can hold five people. Tours run on a first-come-first-served basis. Art Cart Tours depart from the base of the Great Canadian Flag at the foot of Ouellette Avenue. Fee-based tours require reservations. Fee-based tours are offered outside of public tour hours.

Works

 Trees, Toni Putnam
Triptych, Gord Smith (sculptor)

Tembo Day 
Each year, the citizens of Windsor are invited to participate in washing Tembo. Tembo, a large bronze sculpture located in the Windsor Sculpture Park was created by Derrick Stephan Hudson. The sculpture features a mother elephant as well as two young babies.

Each year, the citizens of Windsor are invited by the City of Windsor to help wash the elephants on Tembo Day. After a  bath of gentle clean of warm water and soap using toothbrushes, Sculpture Conservation Assistants spend a couple of days applying wax to protect the sculpture in preparation for the winter

The goal of Tembo Day is to create a better understanding of the importance of maintaining and preserving the care for bronze sculptures along the Windsor Sculpture Park.

Tembo Day has gained recognition throughout Windsor for its engagement with the community and has been featured in the Windsor Star  and CBC Windsor.

See also
List of sculpture parks
Riverfront Bike Trail

References

External links

Windsor Sculpture Park - City of Windsor
Windsor Ontario Riverside Tour (July 2004) - "Google Video" (0:21:12)
Local tourism information about Odette Sculpture Park

Art museums and galleries in Ontario
Sculpture gardens, trails and parks in Canada
Parks in Windsor, Ontario
Museums in Windsor, Ontario